Saint-Armand is a municipality in the Canadian province of Quebec, located within the Brome-Missisquoi Regional County Municipality and the Eastern Townships. The population as of the Canada 2011 Census was 1,248. It is located on the Canada–United States border.

The Municipality of Saint-Armand and the Village of Philipsburg were amalgamated on February 3, 1999 to become the new Municipality of Saint-Armand.

Philipsburg, first known as Missiskoui Bay, was settled in 1784 and was reportedly the first settlement in the Eastern Townships. Saint-Armand, earlier known as Moore's Corners, was the site of the Skirmish of Moore's Corners, an 1837 battle in the Lower Canada Rebellion.

Demographics

Population
Population trend:

(+) Amalgamation of the Municipality of Saint-Armand and the Village of Philipsburg on February 3, 1999.

Language
Mother tongue language (2006)

In addition to its French and English speaking populations, Saint-Armand is home to a number of Germanophones, with about 11% of the population speaking the language as of 2011.

Notable people
Polly Barber
Maria Elise Turner Lauder (1833–1922), writer
Langley Frank Willard Smith - WW1 flying ace

See also
List of municipalities in Quebec
History of Quebec

References 

 
Municipalities in Quebec
Incorporated places in Brome-Missisquoi Regional County Municipality